Mubeen Gabol (ﻣﺒﯿﻦ ﮔﺒﻮﻝ) also known as Matkoo (ﻣﭩﮑﻮ) is a Pakistani actor and comedian, known for his impressions of celebrities.

Career

He currently appears in TV show Khabardaar on the Express News. Gabol's initial success was for his five-year stint (2007–2011) as a cast member on the Aaj News series 4 Man Show. In 2011, Gabol and the other cast members left Aaj News and signed a contract with Geo TV. They started a similar show named Banana News Network. Gabol became the star of the show with his impressions of various Pakistani public figures. He quit the show in 2014. 

Gabol became known by doing impressions of political and media celebrities on satirical television show 4 Man Show. His fictional character, "Matkoo" was one of the most popular characters of the show. Gabol interviewed many celebrities as Matkoo. In 2011, Gabol left the show and started a new program on GEO TV called Banana News Network (BNN).

2015-present
In 2015, Gabol joined Khabardaar, an Express comedy satire show. He also appeared on GNN Joke Dar Joke in 2018. Gabol made his Lollywood debut in the movie Kataksha, a psychological horror film.

BNN and Khabardaar impressions

Shehbaz Sharif
Shah Rukh Khan
Veena Malik
Kamran Khan
Rana Sanaullah
Aamir Liaquat Hussain
Yousaf Raza Gillani
Arnab Goswami
Sherry Rehman
Shireen Mazari
Umer Sharif
Najam Sethi
Asif Ali Zardari
Navjot Singh Sidhu
Shah Mahmood Qureshi
Mirza Iqbal Baig

Filmography

Film

Television

Reality shows

Web shows

References

External links

Living people
Baloch people
Comedians from Sindh
Pakistani male television actors
Pakistani stand-up comedians
1986 births
Pakistani male comedians
Pakistani impressionists (entertainers)